Sepp van den Berg (born 20 December 2001) is a Dutch professional footballer who plays as centre-back for Bundesliga club Schalke 04, on loan from Liverpool.

Club career

PEC Zwolle 
After successfully progressing through the PEC Zwolle youth ranks since 2012, Van den Berg made his first team debut on 11 March 2018, coming on as a 45th minute substitute in a 2–0 league defeat at home to Groningen.

Liverpool 
On 27 June 2019, Van den Berg joined Liverpool for a confirmed fee of £1.3 million, which could potentially rise up to £4.4 million if all agreed clauses are activated. He made his competitive debut for the club on 25 September 2019 in an EFL Cup match against Milton Keynes Dons. Van den Berg made his first start in Liverpool's 5–5 draw against Arsenal in the EFL Cup fourth round on 30 October. Liverpool went on to win 5–4 in the penalty shoot-out.

Loan to Preston North End
On 1 February 2021, Van den Berg joined EFL Championship side Preston North End on loan for the remainder of the 2020–21 season. Five days later, he made his debut for Preston as a substitute for Paul Huntington in a 1–2 home league defeat by Rotherham United.

On 21 June 2021, Van den Berg extended his loan to Preston by an additional 12 months, to an 18 month loan deal, to remain at the club for the 2021–22 season. He scored his first professional goal in a 4-2 win at Morecambe in the EFL Cup in August 2021.

Loan to Schalke 04
On 30 August 2022, van den Berg joined Bundesliga side Schalke 04 on a season-long loan.

International career
Van den Berg is a youth international for the Netherlands. After accruing 10 caps and 3 goals for Netherlands U19’s, Van den Berg made his debut for Netherlands U21’s in a 5-0 win against Wales on 12th October 2021.

Personal life
His younger brother Rav plays for PEC Zwolle in the Eredivisie.

Career statistics

Club

Honours
Liverpool
FIFA Club World Cup: 2019

References

External links

Profile at the Liverpool F.C. website

2001 births
Living people
Sportspeople from Zwolle
Footballers from Overijssel
Dutch footballers
Association football defenders
PEC Zwolle players
Liverpool F.C. players
Preston North End F.C. players
FC Schalke 04 players
FC Schalke 04 II players
Eredivisie players
English Football League players
Bundesliga players
Regionalliga players
Netherlands youth international footballers
Netherlands under-21 international footballers
Dutch expatriate footballers
Expatriate footballers in England
Expatriate footballers in Germany
Dutch expatriate sportspeople in England
Dutch expatriate sportspeople in Germany